Guangzhou North railway station is a railway station in Huadu District in northern Guangzhou, Guangdong Province, China, opened in 1908.

The station is served both by the high-speed trains of the Wuhan–Guangzhou high-speed railway and by regular passenger trains on the original Beijing–Guangzhou railway running along the same route.

Metro station

It is served by Line 9 of Guangzhou Metro.

See also
Huadu railway station

Guangzhou South railway station, 17 km from central Guangzhou, now receives most high speed trains to and from the city, and its opening diminished the importance of the somewhat remote Guangzhou North railway station. Most services that stop at Guangzhou North also stop at Guangzhou South.

References 

Railway stations in Guangzhou
Stations on the Beijing–Guangzhou Railway
Stations on the Wuhan–Guangzhou High-Speed Railway
Railway stations in China opened in 1908